Easington is a settlement in Jamaica.

References

Populated places in Saint Thomas Parish, Jamaica

 
Easington was also the district where Paul Bogle rested.